George Street may refer to:

People 
Ordered chronologically
George Dixon Street (1812–1882), lawyer, judge and political figure in New Brunswick
George Edmund Street (1824–1881), English architect
G. S. Street (George Slythe Street) (1867–1936), English critic, journalist and novelist
George Street (cricketer) (1889–1924), English wicket-keeper
George L. Street III (1913–2000), submariner in the United States Navy

Streets 
George Street, Aberdeen, Scotland
George Street, Brisbane, Australia
George Street, Croydon, England, location of George Street tram stop
George Street, Dunedin, New Zealand
George Street, Edinburgh, Scotland
George Street, Oxford, England
George Street, Richmond, London, England
George Street (St. John's), Canada
George Street, Sydney, Australia
George Street, Toronto, Canada

Bridges 
George Street Bridge (disambiguation)

See also
 George Bridge (disambiguation)
 George (disambiguation)

Street, George